Plicata, plicate, plicated, pleated or folded in Latin, may refer to:
 Lingua plicata, a benign condition characterized by deep grooves in the dorsum of the tongue
 Pars plicata, the folded and most anterior portion of the ciliary body, which in turn is part of the uvea, choroidea, one of the three layers that comprise the eye

See also
 Glossary of botanical terms#plicate